The Scima da Saoseo (also known as Cima di Saoseo) is a mountain of the Livigno Alps, located on the border between Italy and Switzerland. It lies west of Cima Viola. On its west (Swiss) side it overlooks Lago di Saoseo.

References

External links
 
 Scima da Saoseo on Hikr

Mountains of the Alps
Alpine three-thousanders
Mountains of Switzerland
Mountains of Lombardy
Italy–Switzerland border
International mountains of Europe
Mountains of Graubünden